Irene E. Parmelee, her surname also spelled Parmely (1847 – 1934), was an American painter and portrait artist.

Early life
Irene E. Parmelee born in Guilford, Connecticut. She was the daughter of Mary and Horton L. Parmelee, a farmer. Her older siblings were Emily, Charles, Mary, and Jane.

Education
Parmelee studied under Henry Bryant of Hartford beginning in 1872 and the following year with Nathaniel Jocelyn in New Haven. She studied for a year at the Yale Art School, which had just begun admitting women, under Robert Walter Weir. Still stating to others that she was still a student, she opened a studio in Springfield, Massachusetts in 1875.

Parmelee later traveled to Paris and attended the Académie Julian from 1881 to 1884 where she studied with Joseph-Nicolas Robert-Fleury, Pierre Auguste Cot, and Jules Joseph Lefebvre.

Career
She was a career portrait artist and operated a studio in Springfield, Massachusetts from 1875 to 1929. Parlee painted the portrait of Marcus Perrin Knowlton, Chief Justice of the Massachusetts Supreme Judicial Court, made after a photogravure, in 1912. It hung in the court house in Springfield following a formal presentation ceremony at the fourth annual Massachusetts Bar Association meeting in December of that year. She was paid $1,125 for the framed painting.

Parmelee made a portrait of Samuel Bowles, III, who was an editor of the Republican and a City Library Association member for 37 years and was on the board of directors for 24 years. His wife donated the portrait to the Springfield Library, which was hung next to a portrait of his father, Samuel Bowles, II.

Death
She died on August 29, 1934 in Los Angeles, California.

Works
A partial list of her paintings are:
 Amherst College, Mead Art Museum, Amherst, Massachusetts
 Chester W. Chapin (b. 1798), oil, copy after Joseph Oriel Eaton
 George Walter Vincent Smith Art Museum, Springfield, Massachusetts
 Horace Smith, oil, 1881
 Horatio N. Case, oil, 1890
 Charles M. Merriam, oil, 1890
 Henry S. Lee, oil, 1891
 James M. Thompson, oil, 1895
 Ephraim Bond, oil, 1896
 Samuel Bowles, oil, 1896
 Dr. Josiah Gilbert Holland, oil, 1896
 James Kirkham, oil, 1896
 Everett Hosmer Barney, oil, 1903
 John Olmsted, oil, 1903
 Julius Appleton, oil, 1907
 Chester Chapin, oil
 Mrs. Timothy M. Walker, oil
 Maine State Museum, Augusta
 Portrait of George Evans, oil, 1901
 Massachusetts Historical Society
 Mrs. Edward Bates (Lucy Douglas Fowler) 1830-1916
 Museum of Fine Arts, Springfield, Massachusetts
 Portrait of James Philip Gray, oil
 Unitarian Church, Boston, Massachusetts
 John Wille, oil, 1886
 Yale University, School of Medicine, New Haven, Connecticut
 Henry Bronson (1804-1893), oil on canvas, 1881

References

Further reading

External links 
 Portrait of Chester W. Chapin by I.E. Parmelee

1847 births
1934 deaths
American women painters
Painters from Connecticut
Académie Julian alumni
19th-century American painters
20th-century American painters
19th-century American women artists
20th-century American women artists